Colin James (born 1964) is a Canadian musician.

Colin James may also refer to:

 Colin James (architect), known as Col, involved in the establishment of the Aboriginal Housing Company in Sydney, Australia, in 1972
 Colin James (bishop) (1926–2009), Bishop of Wakefield, 1977–1985, and Winchester, 1985–1995
 Colin James (journalist) (born 1944), New Zealand journalist
 Colin James (album), the 1988 debut album from Canadian musician Colin James

James, Colin